Larisa Tsagarayeva (born 4 October 1958) is a Soviet fencer. She won a silver medal in the women's team foil event at the 1980 Summer Olympics.

References

1958 births
Living people
Russian female foil fencers
Soviet female foil fencers
Olympic fencers of the Soviet Union
Fencers at the 1980 Summer Olympics
Olympic silver medalists for the Soviet Union
Olympic medalists in fencing
Sportspeople from Vladikavkaz
Medalists at the 1980 Summer Olympics